Platon Platonovich Zakharchuk (born 10 September 1972 in Naberezhnye Chelny) is a Russian professional football coach and a former player who works as an assistant coach with FC Orenburg.

He made his professional debut in the Soviet Second League in 1989 for FC Torpedo Naberezhnye Chelny.

Honours
 Russian Premier League runner-up: 1997, 2001.

European club competitions
 UEFA Intertoto Cup 1996 with FC KAMAZ-Chally Naberezhnye Chelny: 6 games.
 UEFA Cup 1997–98 with FC Rotor Volgograd: 6 games.

References

1972 births
People from Naberezhnye Chelny
Living people
Soviet footballers
Russian footballers
FC KAMAZ Naberezhnye Chelny players
PFC CSKA Moscow players
FC Rotor Volgograd players
FC Lokomotiv Moscow players
FC Shinnik Yaroslavl players
FC Sokol Saratov players
Russian Premier League players
Russian football managers
Association football goalkeepers
Sportspeople from Tatarstan